Vladimir Nazlymov (born November 1, 1945) (Daghestan, USSR) - Sabre fencer and coach for USSR and later United States, to which he moved in 1991. Born in Makhachkala, Daghestan.

Early years

Nazlymov began fencing at a young age in Makhachkala, Daghestan. 

A 1970 graduate of The Daghestan State Pedagogical Institute, Nazlymov earned a bachelor's and master's degree in physical education. He earned the title of Master of the Sport (Fencing) in 1968.

While fulfilling a two-year army obligation, which was mandatory for all 18-year-olds in the Soviet Union, Nazlymov was put in a special regimen where he was able to fence with the Central Sports Army Club team in Moscow. He achieved a rank of colonel with the Red Army.

Competitive years / Olympics / Civilian awards

Competing for the Soviet Union, Nazlymov was a three-time Olympic Team Gold medalist (1968, 1976, 1980), Team Silver medalist (1972) and individual silver and bronze medalist (1976, 1972). In addition to his six Olympic medals, Nazlymov also is a 10-time World Champion. Eight of the championships were team titles, while two were individual crowns (1975, 1979). Additionally, he was a world championship silver medalist (1977) and bronze medalist (1970, 1973). From 1971-1977, Nazlymov reigned as the USSR national champion (team and individual). Nazlymov twice was named the world's best sabre fencer by the (F.I.E.) International Fencing Federation (1975, 1977).

For his achievements and dedication to the sport of fencing, Nazlymov also was awarded two civilian medals of the Soviet Union (Medal "For Labour Valour", Medal "For Distinguished Labour")

Coaching career
Nazlymov's coaching career began in Moscow as the head coach of the Soviet Union Military Fencing Team from 1976-90. The Central Sports Army Club (ЦСКА) in Moscow was a state of the art training facility for the Soviet Olympic Machine. The club churned out teams that dominated Olympic ice hockey, gymnastics, fencing, Greco-Roman wrestling, and many more. From 1970-80, Nazlymov served as the captain of the USSR Olympic Team. His students won two Olympic gold medals and 12 world championships, as well as eight European Championship crowns. From 1986-88, Nazlymov served as the USSR National Team's head coach. The USSR went on to win a gold medal at the 1986 World Championships and silver medals at the 1987 Worlds and 1988 Olympics.

Move to USA
After moving to the United States with his family in 1991, Nazlymov captained the USA team at the World Championships from 1995–97 and at the 1995 and 1997 World University Games. Nazlymov also served as the sabre coach for the U.S. National Team from 1994-99. Nazlymov guided US teams to a ninth-place finish at the 1996 Olympics, third place at the 1997 Junior World Championships, and 12th place at the Senior World Championships.  He was named a coach for the 1999 US Pan American Games and 1999 Senior World Championships teams.  His US Junior Team finished in second place in the overall medal count at the Junior Worlds in 2001.  In 1999, he was named Coach of the Year by the United States Fencing Association.

NCAAs
In the end of 1999, Nazlymov came to The Ohio State University after spending eight years as the head coach for the Kansas City, Mo., School District, where he developed a fencing program, and established a private club in the Kansas City area (KCFC).  Nazlymov's new goal was to guide his new team to win an NCAA crown and produce a new generation of US Olympic fencers.  In the 2003–04 and 2007-08 seasons, Nazlymov guided Ohio State Buckeyes to the NCAA Collegiate Fencing National Championship, as well as produced several individual NCAA champions (Adam Crompton, Boaz Ellis, Andras Horanyi) and other All-Americans.  In 2004, two of Nazlymov's students, Jason Rogers and Louise Bond-Williams qualified for the 2004 Olympic Games in Athens, Greece. Most recent OSU Fencing team member and Nazlymov's student Siobhan Byrne participated in 2008 Olympic Games in Beijing, China. In his eight years at Ohio State, Nazlymov holds a men's and women's combined record of 270-73 (.787). He retired from coaching in Spring 2018.

Officiating credentials
Nazlymov is an internationally ranked referee (Category A) and officiated at the 1988 Olympic games as well as World Championships from 1981 to 1990.

Progeny
Nazlymov's son, Vitali began fencing the age of 9 under the instruction of Anzor Gagulashvili in Central Sports Army Club.  Vitali was bronze medalist in the USSR youth and junior nationals as well as a champion of the Military Games.  He was also a candidate for the 1992 USSR Olympic Team.  After moving to United States, Vitali was offered a full scholarship to Penn State University.  At Penn State, he won 1991 Individual NCAA championship and led the team to two national championship titles. Vitali pursued a career in banking, in a role of VP with Morgan Stanley.

Fencing Alliance of Ohio
In his quest to raise the bar on the level of fencing in United States and to develop an Olympic Caliber Nationwide Training program, Nazlymov started a new club in Columbus, OH, called the Fencing Alliance of Ohio.

Books
Foil, Saber, and Épée Fencing: Skills, Safety, Operations, and Responsibilities by Maxwell R. Garret (Author), Guglielmo Pezza (Author), Emmanuil G. Kaidanov (Author) foreword by Vladimir Nazlymov.

See also
Fencing
List of notable fencers
List of Olympic medalists in fencing (men)
Fencing terminology

References

External links
Fédération internationale d'escrime 
Central Army Sports Club
United States Fencing Associations
Ohio State Buckeyes Fencing

1945 births
Living people
Soviet male sabre fencers
Russian male sabre fencers
Olympic fencers of the Soviet Union
Ohio State University faculty
Fencers at the 1968 Summer Olympics
Fencers at the 1972 Summer Olympics
Fencers at the 1976 Summer Olympics
Fencers at the 1980 Summer Olympics
Olympic gold medalists for the Soviet Union
Olympic silver medalists for the Soviet Union
Olympic bronze medalists for the Soviet Union
Olympic medalists in fencing
Medalists at the 1968 Summer Olympics
Medalists at the 1972 Summer Olympics
Medalists at the 1976 Summer Olympics
Medalists at the 1980 Summer Olympics
Universiade medalists in fencing
Universiade gold medalists for the Soviet Union
Universiade bronze medalists for the Soviet Union
Medalists at the 1970 Summer Universiade
Medalists at the 1973 Summer Universiade
Sportspeople from Makhachkala